Hyosciurus is a genus of rodent in the family Sciuridae endemic to Sulawesi, Indonesia. 
It contains the following species:
 Montane long-nosed squirrel (Hyosciurus heinrichi)
 Lowland long-nosed squirrel (Hyosciurus ileile)

References

 
Rodents of Sulawesi
Rodent genera
Taxonomy articles created by Polbot